J. Gary Simrill (born May 29, 1966) is an American politician. He is a member of the South Carolina House of Representatives from the 46th District, serving since 1992. On December 6, 2016, he was elected as majority leader of the South Carolina House, which he held until May 2022. He is a member of the Republican party.

Simrill was the primary sponsor of the Infrastructure and Economic Development Act that went into effect on July 1, 2017.

During the 2019 Legislative Session, he authored and shepherded through the General Assembly the bill that allowed the Carolina Panthers to move their practice facilities to Rock Hill, South Carolina.

References

1966 births
21st-century American politicians
Living people
Republican Party members of the South Carolina House of Representatives